This list contains the known compositions of Bill Evans. It is likely that some of his works have not survived or remain unpublished, for example, a piece titled "Very Little Suite", an assignment composed during his college years.

References

Sources

Evans, Bill